Hubbard Lake is an unincorporated community and census-designated place (CDP) in Alcona County in the U.S. state of Michigan. The population was 857 at the 2020 census.  Hubbard Lake occupies portions of Alcona, Caledonia, and Hawes township.

The CDP surrounds Hubbard Lake and also includes the unincorporated communities of Backus Beach and Larson Beach.

Geography

Demographics

As of the census of 2000, there were 993 people, 491 households, and 341 families residing in the CDP. The racial makeup of the CDP was 98.89% White, 0.20% Asian, and 0.91% from two or more races. Hispanic or Latino of any race were 0.30% of the population.

There were 491 households, out of which 11.2% had children under the age of 18 living with them, 64.4% were married couples living together, 3.1% had a female householder with no husband present, and 30.5% were non-families. 27.3% of all households were made up of individuals, and 16.7% had someone living alone who was 65 years of age or older.  The average household size was 2.01 and the average family size was 2.38.

In the CDP, the population was spread out, with 9.9% under the age of 18, 3.3% from 18 to 24, 14.2% from 25 to 44, 38.0% from 45 to 64, and 34.6% who were 65 years of age or older.  The median age was 60 years. For every 100 females, there were 101.8 males.  For every 100 females age 18 and over, there were 102.0 males.

The median income for a household in the CDP was $38,611, and the median income for a family was $41,827. Males had a median income of $32,250 versus $27,500 for females. The per capita income for the CDP was $24,550.  About 4.7% of families and 7.0% of the population were below the poverty line, including 2.8% of those under age 18 and 5.8% of those age 65 or over.

Education
The Hubbard Lake CDP is served entirely by Alcona Community Schools.

References

Unincorporated communities in Michigan
Unincorporated communities in Alcona County, Michigan
Census-designated places in Michigan
Census-designated places in Alcona County, Michigan